The 2021–22 season was Associazione Calcio Monzas 40th season—and second in a row—in the Serie B, the second level of Italian football. The club ended the Serie B campaign in fourth place, and participated in the promotion play-offs. After defeating Pisa after extra time in the final, Monza were promoted to the Serie A for the first time in their history. They also participated in the Coppa Italia, the Italian domestic cup, and were eliminated in the round of 64.

Pre-season and friendlies
On 15 July 2021, Monza played their first pre-season friendly against Real Vicenza in Ronzone; the match ended in a 14–0 win. They then followed with a 5–0 win against Eccellenza side Anaune Val di Non five days later. Monza finished their training camp in Ronzone on 24 July, by beating newly-promoted Serie C club Pro Sesto 3–0.

On 31 July, Monza played Juventus in their first Trofeo Luigi Berlusconi game; Juventus won 2–1. Monza played their last two pre-season friendlies on 4 and 8 August, drawing 1–1 to Pro Patria, and winning 3–0 at home against Giana Erminio.

Results list Monza's goal tally first.

Serie B

Overview 

Monza began the season under Giovanni Stroppa, who was appointed in place of Cristian Brocchi. They played their first game on 21 August 2021, drawing 0–0 to Reggina away from home. Monza's first three points came on 29 August, in their first game at home, in a 1–0 win against Cremonese; Christian Gytkjær scored Monza's first league goal of the season, assisted by Pedro Pereira. In September, Monza opened with two 1–1 draws, to SPAL and Ternana respectively, before losing their first league game on 21 September, in a 2–1 defeat to Pisa. They ended the month in 11th place, with a 3–1 win over Pordenone from a comeback. On 1 October, Monza suffered a heavy defeat away to Lecce, with the 3–0 result moving Monza to 13th place.

Between 17 October and 11 December, Monza went through a 10-game unbeaten streak; they alternated away draws (to Parma, Vicenza, Crotone and Ascoli) to home wins (against Cittadella, Alessandria, Como and Cosenza), finishing with wins against Brescia and Frosinone in December. Key moments included Marco D'Alessandro's stoppage-time goal to help Monza beat Cittadella 1–0, José Machín's 30-meter goal in the 88th-minute which helped his side win 3–2 against Como, Dany Mota's consecutive braces at home against Como and Cosenza, and Monza's first away win of the season, a 2–0 victory over Brescia on 5 December. Thanks to their unbeaten streak, Monza climbed eight places and headed into 2022 in joint-third place.

Monza began the new year poorly, losing 3–1 away to Benevento; a 2–2 home draw to Perugia via a Patrick Ciurria stoppage-time penalty goal meant that Monza finished the first leg in sixth place. Their last game of the month was a 1–0 home win against Reggina. In February, after wins against SPAL and Ternana, Monza lost their first home game of the season after 11 matches, in a 2–1 defeat against Pisa. After a 4–1 away win to Pordenone thanks to a Mattia Valoti brace, Monza lost at home once again (1–0 to Lecce), closing February in sixth place. Monza went unbeaten in March, drawing once and winning four times; they climbed three positions, ending the month in third position. Most of their points came via last-minute goals, in the draw against Parma, and wins against Cittadella and Crotone.

After losing to rivals Como in April, Monza won against Ascoli and Cosenza 2–0, with Valoti and Gytkjær scoring a goal each in both games. With the two wins, Monza climbed to second place for the first time in the season, in a spot for direct promotion. Despite losing crucial points to Brescia and Frosinone, other results went in Monza's favour, who only dropped one position. They defeated fourth placed Benevento 3–0 at home via a Mota brace, and surpassed Cremonese in second place. Monza headed into the final matchday in May against Perugia needing a win for automatic Serie A promotion; Perugia won 1–0 and Monza finished the season in fourth place, qualifying to the promotion play-offs.

Matches 
 Results list Monza's goal tally first.

League table

Serie B promotion play-offs

Overview 

Having finished the regular season in fourth place, Monza gained direct access to the semi-finals of the promotion play-offs. They played against Brescia, winning both legs 2–1. On 26 May 2022, Monza played the first leg of the play-off final against Pisa; after leading 2–0, Monza conceded in stoppage time, with the match finishing 2–1.

Three days later, on 29 May, the two sides played the second leg in Pisa. After only nine minutes, the home side were leading 2–0. Machín's 20th-minute goal shortened the distance. In the second half, Gytkjær's 79th-minute equalizer meant that Monza were only 11 minutes from Serie A promotion. However, a last-minute goal by Pisa's Giuseppe Mastinu forced the game into extra time. Goals by Luca Marrone and Gytkjær gave Monza the win, and their first promotion to the Serie A. Gytkjær finished the play-offs with five goals in four games, and was nominated MVP of the play-offs.

Matches
Results list Monza's goal tally first.

Bracket

Coppa Italia 

Monza were drawn in the round of 64 with Cittadella on 14 August 2021. Cittadella took the early lead in the eighth minute through Orji Okwonkwo, with Carlos Augusto equalizing for Monza 18 minutes later; five minutes before the end of the first half, Cittadella regained the lead with a Mamadou Tounkara goal. The match ended 2–1, and Monza were eliminated from the cup.

Results list Monza's goal tally first.

Player details 

|}

Transfers

Summer

Winter

Notes

References

External links
  

A.C. Monza seasons
Monza